Melpomene was launched in 1815 at King's Lynn. She traded with North America, the West Indies, the East Indies,  and South American. She was wrecked in 1833 while in the North Atlantic, forcing her crew to abandon here.

Career
Melpomene first appeared in Lloyd's Register (LR) with Vidal, owner, and trade Lynn–London. It did not gave the name of her owner, noting only that she was owned in London. Her next voyage was to Philadelphia.

In 1813 the British East India Company (EIC) had lost its monopoly on the trade between Britain and India. British ships were then free to sail to India, the Indian Ocean, or the East Indies under a license from the EIC.

Fate
Heavy seas took was Melpomenes mast and caused extensive damage on 24 April 1833 as Melpomene was on a voyage from the Clyde to Quebec City. Her crew abandoned her three days later; Isabella rescued them.

Citations and references
Citations

References

1815 ships
Age of Sail merchant ships of England
Maritime incidents in April 1833